The 1930 Erskine Flying Fleet football team represented Erskine College as a member the Southern Intercollegiate Athletic Association (SIAA) during the 1930 college football season. Led by third-year head coach Jakie Todd, the Flying Fleet compiled an overall record of 2–5–1, with a mark of 1–2–1 in conference play.

Schedule

References

Erskine
Erskine Flying Fleet football seasons
Erskine Flying Fleet football